S Coronae Australis (S CrA), is a young binary star system estimated to be around 2 million years old located in the constellation Corona Australis. It is composed of a G-type main sequence star that is about as luminous as and just over twice as massive as the Sun, and a smaller K-type main sequence star that has around 50-60% of the Sun's luminosity and 1.3 times its mass. Both stars are T Tauri stars and both show evidence of having circumstellar disks. The system is around 140 parsecs distant.

References

Corona Australis
T Tauri stars
G-type main-sequence stars
K-type main-sequence stars
Coronae Australis, S
Binary stars